Pinchas Cohen is the dean of the USC Leonard Davis School of Gerontology, holds the William and Sylvia Kugel Dean's Chair in Gerontology and serves as the executive director of the Ethel Percy Andrus Gerontology Center.

Cohen graduated in 1986 with highest honors from the medical school at Technion in Israel and trained at Stanford University between 1986 and 1992.  He held his first faculty position at the University of Pennsylvania from 1992 to 1999. Until summer 2012, he was a professor and vice chair for research at the Mattel Children's Hospital UCLA at the Ronald Reagan UCLA Medical Center, as well as the co-director of the UCSD/UCLA Diabetes Research Center. He serves on the advisory board for the Milken Institute Center for the Future of Aging.

Research 

He received numerous awards for his research, including a National Institute of Aging "EUREKA"-Award and the NIH-Director-Transformative R01-Grant. He also recently received the Glenn Award for Research in Biological Mechanisms of Aging. Cohen's research focuses on aging, neurodegeneration, cancer and diabetes with an emphasis on the emerging science of mitochondrial-derived peptides, which he discovered. He has also discussed the possibilities of applying personalized medicine to aging science, coining the term "personalized aging."

His laboratory was one of three teams that independently discovered humanin (Cohen and his team had been screening for proteins that interact with IGFBP3). Other mitochondrial peptides discovered by the Cohen laboratory include SHLP 1, 2, 3, 4, 5, and 6 and MOTS-C.

He holds several patents for novel peptides and is the co-founder of CohBar, a biotechnology company developing peptides found in mitochondria for diabetes treatment. Cohen has published more than 250 papers in top scientific journals.

An expert in the field, Cohen is president-elect of the Growth Hormone Society and served on the Endocrine Society Steering Committee.    He sits on multiple NIH study sections and on several editorial boards.

References 

Living people
American gerontologists
University of Southern California faculty
Year of birth missing (living people)